Parila may refer to several places in Estonia:

Parila, Harju County, village in Anija Parish, Harju County
Parila, Lääne County, village in Ridala Parish, Lääne County
Parila, Saare County, village in Kaarma Parish, Saare County